The Boston Jr. Terriers are a Tier I and Tier II Elite and AAA youth ice hockey organization playing in the Eastern Hockey Federation. The team plays at the Canton Sportsplex located in Canton, Massachusetts and Bavis Ice Arena located in Rockland, Massachusetts.

History
The Terriers were founded in 2004, by former National Hockey League player Chris O'Sullivan and his brother Kevin. Since 2004, the Terriers have also competed in the Eastern Hockey Federation (EHF) having more than 20 age groups from the mite level to midgets. In 2009, the Terrier teams located out of Rockland, Massachusetts changed their name to the Boston Little Rangers before changing back to the Terriers in 2011. In June 2011, current General Manager Brian Yandle joined the Terriers. And in 2012, Mike Roberts joined the Terriers as the CEO/President. The Terriers have won 4 EHF championships since 2004.

Advisory board
The Terriers have many current NHL players that attend summer camps which the Terriers organization offer to players and approve the organization. Some of these players include:

Keith Yandle - Phoenix Coyotes
Ryan Whitney - Florida Panthers
Milan Lucic - Boston Bruins
Dennis Seidenberg - Boston Bruins
Keith Aucoin - St. Louis Blues 
Cory Schneider - New Jersey Devils
Jimmy Hayes - Chicago Blackhawks
David Warsofsky - Providence Bruins
Chris Bourque - Providence Bruins

2004 establishments in Massachusetts
Canton, Massachusetts
Ice hockey clubs established in 2004
Ice hockey teams in Massachusetts
Sports in Norfolk County, Massachusetts